Daniel Breck (February 12, 1788 – February 4, 1871) was a member of the U.S. House of Representatives from Kentucky.

Daniel Breck (brother of Samuel Breck) was born in Topsfield, Massachusetts.  He graduated from Dartmouth College in Hanover, New Hampshire, in 1812.  He studied law, was admitted to the bar in 1814 and commenced practice in Richmond, Kentucky, in October of the same year.  He was judge of the Richmond County Court.  He was a member of the Kentucky House of Representatives from 1824 to 1827 and again in 1834.  He was president of the Richmond branch of the State Bank of Kentucky from 1835 to 1843.  He was appointed associate judge of the Supreme Court of Kentucky on April 7, 1843, and served until 1849. He owned slaves.

Breck was elected as a Whig to the Thirty-first Congress.  He returned to Richmond, Kentucky, and again served as president to the Richmond branch of the State bank.  He died in Richmond on February 4, 1871 and is buried at the Richmond Cemetery.

References

The Political Graveyard

1788 births
1871 deaths
People from Topsfield, Massachusetts
American people of English descent
Whig Party members of the United States House of Representatives from Kentucky
Members of the Kentucky House of Representatives
Judges of the Kentucky Court of Appeals
Kentucky state court judges
Kentucky lawyers
American bankers
American slave owners
19th-century American judges
19th-century American lawyers
19th-century American businesspeople
Dartmouth College alumni